The Carol Weymuller Open 2013 is the women's edition of the 2013 Carol Weymuller Open, which is a tournament of the WSA World Tour event Gold (Prize money : 50 000 $). The event took place at The Heights Casino in Brooklyn, New York in the United States from 3 October to 6 October. Nicol David won her second Carol Weymuller Open trophy, beating Camille Serme in the final.

Prize money and ranking points
For 2013, the prize purse was $50,000. The prize money and points breakdown is as follows:

Seeds

Draw and results

See also
WSA World Tour 2013
Carol Weymuller Open

References

External links
WSA Carol Weymuller Open 2013 website
Carol Weymuller Open 2013 SquashSite website

Carol Weymuller Open
Carol Weymuller Open
2013 in sports in New York (state)
Carol Weymuller Open